Discoverer 30, also known as Corona 9022, was an American optical reconnaissance satellite which was launched in 1961. It was a KH-3 Corona''' satellite, based on an Agena-B rocket.

The launch of Discoverer 30 occurred at 19:59 UTC on 12 September 1961. A Thor DM-21 Agena-B rocket was used, flying from Launch Complex 75-3-5 at the Vandenberg Air Force Base. Upon successfully reaching orbit, it was assigned the Harvard designation 1961 Omega 1.

Images were recorded onto  film, and returned in a Satellite Recovery Vehicle two days after launch; however, like the previous mission, all of the images returned were found to be out of focus. The Satellite Recovery Vehicle used by Discoverer 30 was SRV-551. Once its images had been returned, Discoverer 30's mission was complete, and it remained in orbit until its decay on 11 December 1961.

References

Spacecraft launched in 1961
Spacecraft which reentered in 1961